Rooberg (English: Red Mountain) is a 50 m (165 ft) hill at Sjuhollendarbukta, a bay on the northwestern coast of the island of Jan Mayen.  The hill is often mentioned during the Dutch wintering at Jan Mayen in 1633–34.

References

 Norwegian Polar Institute Place Names of Svalbard Database

Landforms of Jan Mayen
Hills of Norway